The Johnson City Doughboys are a summer collegiate baseball team of the Appalachian League. They are located in Johnson City, Tennessee, and play their home games at TVA Credit Union Ballpark.

History
From 1975 to 2020, Johnson City, Tennessee, was home to the Johnson City Cardinals, a Rookie affiliate of the St. Louis Cardinals playing in the Appalachian League. In conjunction with a contraction of Minor League Baseball beginning with the 2021 season, the Appalachian League was reorganized as a collegiate summer baseball league, and the Johnson City Cardinals were replaced by a new franchise in the revamped league designed for rising college freshmen and sophomores. 

The new team became known as the Johnson City Doughboys. The nickname is in reference to a statue behind their home stadium, TVA Credit Union Ballpark, named Spirit of the American Doughboy. The statue honors U.S. infantrymen who died during World War I. Doughboys was a nickname for American soldiers during World War I until about the 1940s.

References

External links 
 
 Statistics from Baseball-Reference

2021 establishments in Tennessee
Amateur baseball teams in Tennessee
Appalachian League teams
Baseball teams established in 2021
Johnson City, Tennessee